There is also a Diocese of Masvingo (and a Bishop of Masvingo) in the Anglican Church of the Province of Central Africa.

The Roman Catholic Diocese of Masvingo is a suffragan diocese in the city of Masvingo in the ecclesiastical province of Bulawayo in Zimbabwe.

History
 February 9, 1999: Established as Diocese of Masvingo from the Diocese of Gweru

Bishops
 Michael Dixon Bhasera (9 February 1999 – 19 July 2022)

Other priests of this diocese who became bishops
Xavier Johnsai Munyongani, appointed Bishop of Gweru in 2013
Rudolf Nyandoro, appointed Bishop of Gokwe in 2017

See also
Catholic Church in Zimbabwe

References

Sources
 GCatholic.org
 

Roman Catholic dioceses in Zimbabwe
Christian organizations established in 1999
Roman Catholic dioceses and prelatures established in the 20th century
1999 establishments in Zimbabwe
Roman Catholic Ecclesiastical Province of Bulawayo